Cadomin Cave is a natural limestone cave in the Canadian Rockies near the town of Cadomin, Alberta.

Geography
Cadomin Cave is located within Leyland Mountain at an elevation of 1890m, and was formed within the thickly-bedded limestones of the Palliser Formation.  The cave consists of an upper series of spacious phreatic and keyhole-type passages underlain by somewhat smaller passages connected by tight crawlways.  There is only one known entrance.  Cadomin Cave is named after the town of Cadomin, an acronym for the Canada Dominion Mining company.

Exploration
Cadomin Cave has been known since the early 1900s when prospectors opened up the Coal Branch district, but it was almost certainly known to native peoples before then.  The first cave survey was conducted in 1959 prior to the formation of Canada's caving clubs, and produced an accurate map of the passages of the upper series as far as the Mess Hall, the cave's principal chamber.  In 1977 and 1978 a long-rumored lower series of passages was discovered and surveyed by members of the Alberta Speleological Society, significantly increasing the cave's measured length to 1704m and its depth to 171m.  Subsequent explorations including the discovery of the decorated Crystal Crawls in 1982 and unsuccessful dives of the sump have resulted in a measured length of 2791m and a depth of 220m.

Environmental issues
The spacious, easy cave passages of Cadomin Cave's upper series have been popular with local and visiting outdoor enthusiasts for over a hundred years, and are amongst the most vandalized in the Canadian Rockies.  In 1997 the Alberta Speleological Society became official stewards of Cadomin Cave under a program managed by Alberta Environment, and periodically conduct garbage cleanups and graffiti removal and assist with bat counts. In 1999 the cave was included within the newly formed Whitehorse Wildlands Provincial Park. Cadomin Cave is a hibernaculum for Little Brown Bats, and access is currently prohibited between the first weekend in September and the first day of May. White nose syndrome is expected to arrive in the next few winters, so the cave has been closed via Ministerial order, effective May 14, 2010.  A locked gate will be installed designed to prevent human access while facilitating bat movements.

References

The Canadian Caver Vol 10 No 1 and Vol 14 No 1
Cave Closure - http://www.caving.ab.ca/cadomin

External links
Alberta Speleological Society - Cadomin Cave
Alberta West Country - Cadomin Cave Map
Alberta West Country - Cadomin Cave

Caves of Alberta
Yellowhead County